The Greensboro Area Health Education Center (Greensboro AHEC or GAHEC) is one of nine regional centers affiliated with the North Carolina Area Health Education Centers Program and is administered by the University of North Carolina School of Medicine at Chapel Hill, North Carolina. Greensboro AHEC serves healthcare professionals in an eight-county region including Alamance, Caswell, Chatham, Guilford, Montgomery, Orange, Randolph and Rockingham by providing information resources to both practicing healthcare professionals and students.
 
Greensboro AHEC provides educational programs and information services targeted toward: 
 Improving the distribution and retention of healthcare providers, with a special emphasis on primary care and prevention
 Improving the diversity and cultural competence of the healthcare workforce in all health disciplines
 Enhancing the quality of care and improving healthcare outcomes
 Addressing the healthcare needs of underserved communities and populations

Mission 
The mission of Greensboro AHEC has remained constant since its establishment in 1974 as part of The National AHEC Program: to meet the state's health and health workforce needs by providing educational programs in partnership with academic institutions, healthcare agencies and other organizations committed to improving the health of the people of North Carolina.

Continuing education programs 
Continuing education and training programs are designed to meet the needs of health and human service professionals in various disciplines, including:

Allied health
With over 100 different occupational titles, this workforce includes:
 Clinical Laboratory Science
 Coding
 Dietietics/Nutrition
 Health Information Management
 Nursing Home Administration
 Occupational Therapy
 Physical Therapy
 Radiation Therapy Technology
 Radiologic Technology
 Recreation Therapy
 Respiratory Care/Cardipulmonary
 Speech-Language Pathology

Continuing Medical Education
Dentistry
Mental Health
Nursing
Pharmacy
Online Courses

Online courses are available in most healthcare fields at North Carolina AHEConnect.

History 
In 1971, Congress funded the development of the AHEC system as a national strategy to improve the supply, distribution, retention and quality of primary care and other health practitioners in medically under-served areas.

On July 1, 1974, Greensboro AHEC was founded at Moses H. Cone Memorial Hospital through an affiliation with the University of North Carolina School of Medicine serving six counties (Alamance, Caswell, Guilford, Randolph, Rockingham, and Montgomery). Leonard James Rabold, MD was appointed the first director on November 1, 1974.

Greensboro AHEC is located on the campus of The Moses H. Cone Memorial Hospital in Greensboro, North Carolina.

See also
 Northwest Area Health Education Center

References

External links
 Greensboro AHEC web site
 North Carolina Area Health Education Centers Program
 AHEConnect.com

Healthcare in North Carolina